Vadya, also called vadyaka or atodya, is one of the three components of sangita (musical performance arts), and refers to "instrumental music" in the Indian traditions. The other two components of sangita are gita (vocal music, song) and nrtya (dance, movement). In the general sense, vadya means an instrument and the characteristic music they produce, sound or play out.

Indian musicology 
The term vadya in the sense of "music, sounded, played, uttered" appears in the Vedic literature such as in the Aitareya Brahmana, and in early post-Vedic era Sanskrit texts such as the Natya Shastra, Panchatantra, Malvikagnimitra and Kathasaritsagara. These texts call the musician or the performer on the musical instrument as vadyadhara. A stringed instrument is described with proportional lengths in Jaiminiya Brahmana and Aitareya Aranyaka, and these are compared to poetical meters. The 17th-century text Sangita Darpana defines sangita (musical arts) as "", which states Dona means, sangita comprises gīta (vocal music), vādya (instrumental music) and nritya (dance).

Classification of instruments 

The Sanskrit literature such as Natya Shastra describes four types of vadya:
Tantu: stringed musical instrument (chordophone)
Susira: hollow musical instrument (aerophone)
Ghana: solid musical instrument (idiophone)
Avanaddha: covered musical instrument (membranophone)

Ensembles and orchestras 
The chapter 14 of the Saṅgītaśiromaṇi describes musical ensembles based on a collective performance of vadya instruments by musicians, and it calls such a band orchestra as a kutapa.

Cultural exchange 
The term vadya also appears in the Buddhist Sanskrit text Sukhavativyuha, influential in the Chinese and Japanese traditions, which Luis Gomez translates as "instrumental music".

In Hindu-Javanese music tradition, vadya is called vaditra. According to Roger Blench, most scholars consider the African term valiha for tube zither to be rooted in the Sanskrit term vadya, reflecting a period of cultural exchange over the Indian Ocean.

See also
Indian classical music
List of Indian musical instruments
Natya shastra
Tala
Udaka vadya

References

Hindu texts
Theatre in India
Musical theatre
Sanskrit texts
Cultural history of India